Krzysztof Birula-Białynicki (15 August 1944 – 30 January 2014) was a Polish ice hockey player. He competed at the 1972 Winter Olympics.

See also
 Ice hockey at the 1972 Winter Olympics

References

1944 births
2014 deaths
Ice hockey players at the 1972 Winter Olympics
Olympic ice hockey players of Poland
Polish ice hockey forwards
Sportspeople from Vilnius
Lithuanian Soviet Socialist Republic people
SG Cortina players
Polish expatriate sportspeople in Italy